The bluetail unicornfish, Naso caeruleacauda, is a tropical fish found in coral reefs around Indonesia and the Philippines. It was first named by J.E. Randall in 1994, and is also sometimes called the blue unicorn.

References

External links
 

Naso (fish)
Fish described in 1994